Artiom Puntus (born 31 May 1995) is a Moldovan footballer who plays as a forward for Albanian club Kukësi and the Moldova national team.

Club career
Born in Tiraspol, Puntus started his career with Sheriff Tiraspol. On 21 May 2014, he made his Moldovan National Division debut for the club, coming on as a substitute in a 1–0 win over FC Tiraspol. He spent time on loan at FC Tiraspol, Saxan, Petrocub Hîncești and Sfîntul Gheorghe, before joining Petrocub Hîncești on a permanent basis in January 2019. In August 2020, Puntus joined Milsami Orhei, where he went on to score 13 goals in 31 league games. In September 2021, he joined Albanian Kategoria Superiore side Kukësi on a two-year contract.

International career
Puntus featured in two UEFA European Under-21 Championship qualification matches for Moldova in 2015. He made his debut for the Moldova national team on 9 October 2021, coming on as a substitute in a FIFA World Cup qualification match against Denmark.

References

1995 births
Living people
People from Tiraspol
Association football forwards
Moldovan footballers
Moldova under-21 international footballers
Moldova international footballers
FC Sheriff Tiraspol players
FC Tiraspol players
FC Saxan players
CS Petrocub Hîncești players
FC Sfîntul Gheorghe players
FC Milsami Orhei players
FK Kukësi players
Moldovan Super Liga players
Kategoria Superiore players
Moldovan expatriate footballers
Moldovan expatriate sportspeople in Albania
Expatriate footballers in Albania